The 2023 Ligai Olii Tojikiston (Tajik: 2023 Лигаи Олии Тоҷикистон),, or 2023 Tajikistan Higher League is the 32nd season of the Tajikistan Higher League, Tajikistan's top division of association football.

Season events
On 22 February 2022, the Tajikistan Football Federation announced that the season would commence on 1 April, and follow the same format as the previous season. The 10 teams would play each other twice in the regular stage of the season, before splitting into Championship and Relegation groups where they would then play everyone in their group again, resulting in the bottom two teams being relegated from the league.

Teams
On 28 February, the Tajikistan Football Federation confirmed that 10 teams would take part in the 2023 season.

Personnel and sponsoring

Foreign players

In bold: Players that have been capped for their national team.

Managerial changes

Regular season

League table

Results

Results by round

Season statistics

References

External links
Football federation of Tajikistan

Tajikistan Higher League seasons
1
Tajik